John Boothe (Booth, Bothe, Bowth, or Boyth;  – 1542) was an Anglican priest in the 16th century.

He was the second son of Roger Booth, of Mollington, Cheshire. He succeeded to the Mollington estates on the death of his elder brother, Thomas Booth, in 1528, when he is described as being thirty-three years of age. He was educated at Brasenose College, Oxford, where he graduated with a BA in 1512 and a MA in 1516. Booth was collated to the archdeaconry of Hereford on 29 January 1522 o.s. (1523 n.s.). He died on 15 August 1542, and his niece, Agnes Booth, daughter of his brother, Charles Booth, was found to be his heir then aged nine years.

References

Bibliography
 
 
 
 

Archdeacons of Hereford
17th-century English clergy
Alumni of Brasenose College, Oxford
1495 births
1542 deaths
People from Cheshire
People from Herefordshire